Gav Khaneh (also Romanized as Gāv Khāneh and Gāukhāneh) is a village in Mashhad-e Miqan Rural District, in the Central District of Arak County, Markazi Province, Iran. At the 2006 census, its population was 506, in 124 families.

References 

Populated places in Arak County